The Kankakee Community Resource Center is a multi-purpose center located in Kankakee, Illinois, United States It is  located in a renovated National Guard Armory. The Center has a gymnasium and an auditorium. It offers many community programs, and it is home to the Kankakee County Soldiers formerly of the International Basketball League.

External links 
Official site

Kankakee, Illinois
Basketball venues in Illinois
Tourist attractions in Kankakee County, Illinois